Nobody's Boy may refer to:

 Sans Famille, a novel of 1878 by Hector Malot
 Nobody's Boy: Remi, an anime of 1977 based on the above novel
 Nobody's Boy (1913 film), a silent film of 1913
 Nobody's Boy (musical) a musical of 1919